Dorrigo Mountain, a mountain on the Great Dividing Range, is located in the Northern Tablelands region of New South Wales, Australia.

It is between Dorrigo National Park and Bellinger River National Park.

There is one road that accesses the top of Dorrigo mountain which is the Waterfall Way but the summit is accessible from either direction though the Waterfall Way can close from the east due to flooding and landslides. From the east, the road has a  climb to the top of Dorrigo Mountain. There are also a number of lookouts on top of Dorrigo Mountain into the Bellinger Valley.

See also

 List of mountains in New South Wales

References

Mountains of New South Wales
New England (New South Wales)
Northern Tablelands